Asgiri Maha Viharaya (also called Asgiriya temple, Asgiriya Gedige) is a Buddhist monastery located in Kandy, Sri Lanka. It is the headquarters of the Asgiriya chapter of Siyam Nikaya, one of the two Buddhist monasteries that holds the custodianship of sacred tooth relic of Buddha kept in Sri Dalada Maligawa, Kandy. The chief incumbent of the Asgiri Maha Viharaya is the Mahanayaka thero of Asgiri chapter of Siyam nikaya, a leading Buddhist monastic fraternity in Sri Lanka. The present chief incumbent of Asgiri Maha Viharaya is Venerable Warakagoda Sri Gnanarathana Thero. Asgiri Maha Vihara traces its origin from the Wanavasi sect of the Dimbulagala forest monastery of Polonnaruva. Currently, 565 Buddhist temples in Sri Lanka function under Asgiri Viharaya of Kandy.

History
Asgiri Maha Viharaya was founded by Commander Siriwardhana on the instructions of Parakramabahu IV of Kurunegala (1305-1335 A.D.). Situated north of the Kandy Lake, this temple is believed to be considerably older than the Malwathu Maha Viharaya, the other monastic centre of the Siyam Nikaya. The original buildings were set up in the premises of present day Trinity College. The Buddhist monks who took residence in this monastery were sent from Valasgala hermitage in Yapahuwa. 

The name Valasgala is translated into Pali as "Acchagiri" and the present Sinhalese name Asgiri is derived from it. According to another legend Asgiri was named after  queen Chandrawathie, the mother of king Wikramabahu who was cremated in the cremation ground of Adahana Maluva at Asgiriya. In the history of Kandyan Kingdom many kings have contributed much for the development of Asgiri Viharaya. The monks of Asgiriya chapter have often safeguarded the Tooth Relic on behalf of the ruling monarch during troublesome times such as invasions and rebellions.

Asgiriya monastery consists of the "purana Viharaya" or the 'old temple', "Meda Pansala" or the 'middle temple', the "Aluth Viharaya" or the 'new temple' and the "Gedige Vihara". The middle temple known today as "Meda Pansala" was built by Meegastanne Dissawe of Dumbara in 1767 and the new temple was built by Pilimathalawe Dissawe a year later in 1768. Parana Viharaya or the old temple contains a serene statue of Buddha under a Makara Thorana (Dragon arch), and the interior is very similar to that of Gedige Viharaya.  There are also two statues of deities "Natha" and "Saman"  to the right and left side of the Buddha statue respectively. A new "Aluth Vihare" or the  new temple was modified by Pilimathalawe Adhikaram, a son of Pilimathalawe Dissawe in 1801. Asgiri viharaya also consists of a recumbent Buddha statue carved out of Rock, which is thirty six feet in length and two 'poya-ge's, which are used as the assembly halls for the meetings of the monastic fraternity.

Adahana Maluwa
One of the other historically important sites standing in the Asgiri Maha Vihara premises is the "Adahana Maluwa" or the Royal Cremation Ground of Kandyan kingdom. The viharaya had three "maluwas" or terraces, Uda Maluwa (upper terrace), Meda  Maluwa (centre terrace), Palle Maluwa (lower terrace). The cremation of the Royal family members were done at the Meda Maluwa, therefore the temple in the premises was known as the "Adahanamaluwa Gedige Viharaya". Adahana Maluva was the place where the bodies of the kings of Kandy and their family members were burned and their remains were buried. Historically, Adahanamaluwa Gedige is the second oldest structure in Kandy city and architecturally it has similarities to the structures of Natha devale, Kandy and Gadaladeniya Vihara in Uda Nuwara. During 1878-80 period, the railway line to Matale was constructed by the British colonial government. One of the tunnels of this railway line was constructed below the Adahana Maluva of Asgiri Vihara. The construction work of this tunnel destroyed the last remains of the tombs which were remaining in the Royal burial grounds.

The Asgiriya Chapter has come out out in support of extending human rights to LGBTQ, including support to amend the constitution.

Chief Incumbents
The following is a list of chief incumbents of Asgiri Maha Viharaya, Kandy who are also the Mahanayaka theros of Asgiriya chapter of Siyam Nikaya. Appointment of senior Buddhist monks to the Mahanayaka position in Sri Lanka began with the re-establishment of Upasampada higher ordination in 1753 on the initiatives taken by Sangharaja Weliwita Sri Saranankara Thero during the reign of king Kirti Sri Rajasinha of Kandy.
 Urulewatte Sri Dhamma Siddhi Thero (1753–1778) - 
 Idawalugoda Sri Dhammapala Thero (1778–1807) - 
 Pothuhera Sri Rathanapala Thero (1807–1815) - 
 Mawathagama Sri Shobitha Thero (1815–1822) - 
 Yatawatte Sri Chandajothi Thero (1822–1822) - 
 Vacant (1822-1824)
 Yatanwala Sri Sunanda Thero (1824–1835) - 
 Kotagama Sri Gunarathana Thero (1835–1845) - 
 Vacant (1845-1849)
 Udumulle Sri Rathanajothi Thero (1849–1851) - 
 Vacant (1851-1853)
 Yatawatte Sri Swarnajothi Thero (1853–1868) - 
 Wattegama Sri Sumangala Thero (1869–1885) - 
 Yatawatte Sri Chandajothi Thero (1886–1892)  - 
 Kapuliyadde Sri Piyadassi Thero (1893–1914) - 
 Abagaswewe Sri Rathanajothi Thero (1914–1921) - 
 Gunnepane Sri Saranankara Thero (1921–1929) - 
 Mullegama Sri Gunarathana Thero (1929–1947) - 
 Yatawatte Sri Dhammarathana Thero (1947–1966) - 
 Udugama Sri Rathanapala Thero (1966–1970) - 
 Godamune Sri Nagasena Dhammananda Thero - (1970–1975) 
 Palipane Sri Chandananda Thero (1975–1999) - 
 Udugama Sri Buddharakkitha Thero (1999–2015) - 
 Galagama Sri Aththadassi Thera (2015–2016) - 
 Warakagoda Sri Gnanarathana Thero (2016-) -

See also
 Malwathu Maha Viharaya

References

External links
Sri Dalada Maligawa (official website)
Asgiri Maha Viharaya
Asgiriya Adahanamaluwa Gedige Vihara

Buddhist temples in Kandy
Buddhist monasteries in Sri Lanka
Archaeological protected monuments in Kandy District